Meshchegarovo (Miäşägär) is a rural locality (a selo) and the administrative centre of Meshchegarovsky Selsoviet, Salavatsky District, Bashkortostan, Russia. The population was 534 as of 2010. There are 8 streets.

Geography 
Meshchegarovo is located 45 km north of Maloyaz (the district's administrative centre) by road. Yelanysh is the nearest rural locality.

References 

Rural localities in Salavatsky District